Dylan Martin (born 12 January 1998) is an Australian field hockey player.

Martin was selected in the Kookaburras Olympics squad for the Tokyo 2020 Olympics. The team reached the final for the first time since 2004 but couldn't achieve gold, beaten by Belgium in a shootout. He competed in the 2020 Summer Olympics.

References

External links
 
 

1998 births
Living people
Field hockey players at the 2020 Summer Olympics
Australian male field hockey players
Olympic field hockey players of Australia
Male field hockey defenders
Olympic silver medalists for Australia
Medalists at the 2020 Summer Olympics
Olympic medalists in field hockey